The Erzya language, also Erzian or historically Arisa, is spoken by approximately 300,000 people in the northern, eastern and north-western parts of the Republic of Mordovia and adjacent regions of Nizhny Novgorod, Chuvashia, Penza, Samara, Saratov, Orenburg, Ulyanovsk, Tatarstan and Bashkortostan in Russia. A diaspora can also be found in Armenia and Estonia, as well as in Kazakhstan and other states of Central Asia. Erzya is currently written using Cyrillic with no modifications to the variant used by the Russian language. In Mordovia, Erzya is co-official with Moksha and Russian.

The language belongs to the Mordvinic branch of the Uralic languages. Erzya is a language that is closely related to Moksha but has distinct phonetics, morphology and vocabulary.

Phonology

Consonants 
The following table lists the consonant phonemes of Erzya together with their Cyrillic equivalents.

  "good", subject or object complement in  translative, vs.  "direction; area". See Rueter 2010: 58.

Vowels 
Erzya has a simple five-vowel system.

The front vowels  and  have centralized variants  and  immediately following a plain alveolar consonant, e.g.   "they",   "blue".

Vowel harmony 
As in many other Uralic languages, Erzya has vowel harmony. Most roots contain either front vowels or back vowels. In addition, all suffixes with mid vowels have two forms: the form to be used is determined by the final syllable of the stem. The low vowel, found in the comparative case  "the size of" and the prolative  "spatial multipoint used with verbs of motion as well as position" is a back vowel and not subject to vowel harmony.

The rules of vowel harmony are as follows:

 If the final syllable of the word stem contains a front vowel, the front form of the suffix is used:  "village",  "in a village"
 If the final syllable of the word stem contains a back vowel, and it is followed by plain (non-palatalized) consonants, the back form of the suffix is used:  "house",  "in a house"

However, if the back vowel is followed by a palatalized consonant or palatal glide, vowel harmony is violated and the "front" form of the suffix is used:  "with willow",  "with butter". Likewise, if a front-vowel stem is followed by a low back vowel suffix, subsequent syllables will contain back harmony:  "throughout its villages"

Thus the seeming violations of vowel harmony attested in stems, e.g.

One exception to front-vowel harmony is observed in palatalized non-final , e.g.  "with asphalt".

Morphology 
Like all other Uralic languages, Erzya is an agglutinative language which expresses grammatical relations by means of suffixes.

Nouns 
Nouns are inflected for case, number, definiteness and possessor. Erzya distinguishes twelve cases (here illustrated with the noun   "ground, earth"). Number is systematically distinguished only with definite nouns; for indefinite nouns and nouns with a possessive suffix, only nominative case has a distinct plural.

Plural possessors follow the pattern of second person singular possessors.

Verbs 
Erzya verbs are inflected for tense and mood, and are further conjugated for person of subject and object. Traditionally, three stem types are distinguished: a-stems, o-stems and e-stems. A-stems always retain the stem vowel a in the non-third person present tense forms, and in the third person first past tense forms (e.g.  "kissed"). With many o-stems and e-stems, the stem vowel is dropped in these forms (e.g. o-stem  "watched", e-stem  "swallowed"), but there also o- and e-stem verbs which retain the vowel ( "slept",  "cooked"). Rueter (2010) therefore divides verb stems into vowel-retaining stems and vowel-dropping stems.

In indicative mood, three tenses are distinguished: present/future, first past, second (=habitual) past.

The third person singular form in present tense is also used as present participle. The second past tense is formed by adding the past tense copula  to the present participle.

The other mood categories are:
conditional ( + present suffixes)
conjunctive ( + past suffixes)
conditional-conjunctive ( + past suffixes)
desiderative ( + past suffixes)
optative ( + present suffixes)
imperative

Writing

Cyrillic alphabet
The modern Erzya alphabet is the same as for Russian:

{| style="text-align:center;"
|-
|А||Б||В||Г||Д||Е||Ё||Ж||З||И||Й
|-
|К||Л||М||Н||О||П||Р||С||Т||У||Ф
|-
|Х||Ц||Ч||Ш||Щ ||Ъ||Ы ||Ь||Э||Ю||Я
|}

The letters ф, х, щ and ъ are only used in loanwords from Russian. The pre-1929 version of the Erzya alphabet included the additional letter Cyrillic ligature En Ge (Ҥ ҥ) in some publications, (cf. Evsevyev 1928).

In combination with the alveolar consonants т, д, ц, с, з, н, л, and р, vowel letters are employed to distinguish between plain and palatalized articulations in a similar way as in Russian: а, э, ы, о, у follow plain alveolars, while я, е, и, ё, ю follow palatalized alveolars, e.g. та /ta/, тэ /te/, ты /ti/, то /to/, ту /tu/ vs. тя /tʲa/, те /tʲe/, ти /tʲi/, тё /tʲo/, тю /tʲu/. If no vowel follows, palatalization is indicated by ь, e.g. ть /tʲ/. Following non-alveolar consonants, only а, е, и, о, у occur, e.g. па /pa/, пе /pe/, пи /pi/, по /po/, пу /pu/.

Latin alphabet

A Latin alphabet was officially approved by the government of Nizhne-Volzhskiy Kray in 1932, but it was never used:
a в c ç d ә e f g y i j k l m n o p r s ş t u v x z ƶ ь

One of the modern version of Latin alphabet exists:
a b c č ć d d́ e f g h i j k l ĺ m n ń o p r ŕ s š ś t t́ u v y z ž ź

Another of the modern version of Latin alphabet exist:
a b v g d (d́) e ö ž z (ź) i j k l (ĺ) m n (ń) o p r (ŕ) s (ś) t (t́) u f h c (ć) č š čš y ě ü ä

See also 
Erzya people
Erzya literature
Erzyan Mastor

Bibliography 
A.I. Bryzhinskiy, O.V. Pashutina, Ye.I. Chernov. Писатели Мордовии Биобиблиографический справочник. Saransk: Mordovskoye Knizhnoye Izdatelystvo, 2001. .
Vasilij D'omin. Сюконян тенк... Эрзянь писательде ёвтнемат. Saransk, 2005. .
Ksenija Djordjevic & Jean-Leo Leonard. Parlons Mordve. Paris: L'Harmattan, 2006, .
Makar E. Evsev'ev. Основы мордовской грамматика, Эрзянь грамматика. С приложением образцов мокшанских склонений и спряжений. Москва: Центральное издательство народов СССР, 1928.
Jack Rueter. Adnominal Person in the Morphological System of Erzya. Suomalais-Ugrilaisen Seuran Toimituksia 261. Helsinki: Suomalais-Ugrilainen Seura, 2010,  [print],  [online].
D.V. Tsygankin. Память запечатленная в слове: Словарь географических названий республики Мордовия. Saransk, 2005. .

References

External links 

Finno-Ugric Electronic Library by the Finno-Ugric Information Center in Syktyvkar, Komi Republic (interface in Russian and English, texts in Mari, Komi, Udmurt, Erzya and Moksha languages): 
Erzjanj Mastor – The society for preserving the Erzya language (in Erzya and Russian)
 https://web.archive.org/web/20061029185215/http://www.info-rm.com/er/index.php News in the Erzya and Moksha Mordvinian languages
  Эрзянский язык
 Erzya – Finnish/English/German/Russian dictionary (robust finite-state, open-source) 
  Erzya studies reference bibliography under construction.
 Russian-Moksha-Erzya Dictionary
 Russian-Erzya Dictionary

 
Languages of Russia